The 1904–05 FA Cup was the 34th season of the world's oldest association football competition, the Football Association Challenge Cup (more usually known as the FA Cup). Aston Villa won the competition for the fourth time, beating Newcastle United 2–0 in the final at Crystal Palace, through two goals scored by Harry Hampton. The man of the match was Aston Villa's prolific scorer Billy Garraty, who was born only a few miles from the now Villa Park.

Matches were scheduled to be played at the stadium of the team named first on the date specified for each round, which was always a Saturday. If scores were level after 90 minutes had been played, a replay would take place at the stadium of the second-named team later the same week. If the replayed match was drawn further replays would be held at neutral venues until a winner was determined. If scores were level after 90 minutes had been played in a replay, a 30-minute period of extra time would be played.

Calendar
The format of the FA Cup for the season had two preliminary rounds, six qualifying rounds, an intermediate round, three proper rounds, and the semi finals and final.

Intermediate Round

The Intermediate Round featured ten games, played between the ten winners of the Sixth Qualifying round, and ten teams given byes. Manchester United, Bristol City, West Bromwich Albion, Burnley and Grimsby Town from the Second Division were entered automatically into this round, as were non-league Reading, Portsmouth, Bristol Rovers, Plymouth Argyle and Millwall.

The other Second Division sides had to gain entry to this round through the earlier qualifying rounds. Glossop, Blackpool, Burton United, Gainsborough Trinity, Leicester Fosse and Doncaster Rovers were entered at the Third qualifying round stage, with only Blackpool, Leicester and Gainsborough reaching the intermediate round from these. Chesterfield, Barnsley, Bradford City, Lincoln City and Burslem Port Vale were all entered at the Sixth Qualifying round stage, with only the latter losing in that round.

First round proper
The first round proper contained sixteen ties between 32 teams. The 18 First Division sides were given a bye to this round, as were Liverpool and Bolton Wanderers from the Second Division, and non-league Southampton and Tottenham Hotspur. They joined the ten teams who won in the intermediate round.

The matches were played on Saturday, 4 February 1905. Seven matches were drawn, with the replays taking place in the following midweek fixture. Two of these went to a second replay the following week.

Second round proper
The eight second-round matches were scheduled for Saturday, 18 February 1905. There were two replays, played in the following midweek fixture.

Third round proper
The four quarter final matches were scheduled for Saturday, 4 March 1905. The Preston North End – The Wednesday game was drawn, and replayed on 9 March.

Semifinals

The semi-final matches were played on Saturday, 25 March 1905. Aston Villa's match with Everton was drawn and thus replayed four days later. Aston Villa won and went on to meet Newcastle United in the final.

Replay

Final

The final was contested by Aston Villa and Newcastle United at Crystal Palace. Aston Villa won 2–0, with Harry Hampton scoring both goals.

Match details

See also
FA Cup final results 1872-

References
General
Billy Garraty
Official site; fixtures and results service at TheFA.com
1904-05 FA Cup at rsssf.com
1904-05 FA Cup at soccerbase.com

Specific

1904-05
1904–05 in English football
FA